James Bernard Yates, Sr. was an American politician in the state of Kentucky. He served in the Kentucky House of Representatives as a Democrat from 1973 to 1995.

References

Living people
Democratic Party members of the Kentucky House of Representatives
Politicians from Louisville, Kentucky
Year of birth missing (living people)